Tus-e Olya (also Romanized as Ţūs-e ‘Olyā; also known as Shahr-e Ţūs-e Bālā, Shahr-e Ţūs, and Shahr-e Tūs-e Bālāo) is a village in Tus Rural District, in the Central District of Mashhad County, Razavi Khorasan Province, Iran. At the 2006 census, its population was 460, in 121 families.

References 

Populated places in Mashhad County